Senneville-sur-Fécamp (literally Senneville on Fécamp) is a commune in the Seine-Maritime department in the Normandy region in northern France.

Geography
Spectacular limestone cliffs rise up to around 100 m. There is also a local beach which is used by the residents. There are many bed and breakfasts in and around the village.

Heraldry

Population

Places of interest
 The church of St. Vaast, dating from the thirteenth century.
 A nineteenth-century chateau.

See also
Communes of the Seine-Maritime department

References

Communes of Seine-Maritime